Broken Ties may refer to: 

"Broken Ties", a Stargate Atlantis episode (Stargate Atlantis (season 5)#ep83)
Broken Ties (1918 film), a silent film
Broken Ties, a novel published in 1925 by Rabindranath Tagore